The 2018 V.League 1 season (for sponsorship reasons also known as Nuti Café V.League 1) was the 62nd season of the V.League 1, the highest division of Football in Vietnam. The season started on 10 March 2018 and ran until 8 October 2018.  It was expected to be known as the Toyota V.League 1, however, in December 2017 Toyota ended their sponsorship deal with the Vietnam Football Federation one year early.

Changes from last season

Team changes
The following teams have changed division since the 2017 season.

To V.League 1
Promoted from V.League 2
 Nam Dinh FC

From V.League 1
Relegated to V.League 2
 Long An FC

Rule changes

Due to the increased number of teams in 2018 V.League 2 (10), there will be 1.5 relegation places in the 2018 V.League 1 season - the team finishing 14th will be relegated automatically, whilst the team finishing 13th will play a two-legged play-off against the team that finishes second in the 2018 V.League 2.

The league will continue to operate the "2+1" foreigner rule, meaning each squad shall be allowed 2 non-Vietnamese players and 1 naturalised Vietnamese. FLC Thanh Hoa and Song Lam Nghe An shall be allowed 3 non-Vietnamese players, 1 naturalised Vietnamese and  1 player from Asia because they will participate in AFC Cup.

Teams

Personnel and kits

Managerial changes

Foreign players

 Foreign players who left their clubs after first leg or be replaced because of injuries.
 Player withdrew from the squad due to an injury.

Standings

League table

Positions by round
This table lists the positions of teams after each week of matches. In order to preserve the chronological evolution, any postponed matches are not included to the round at which they were originally scheduled, but added to the full round they were played immediately afterwards. For example, if a match is scheduled for matchday 13, but then postponed and played between days 16 and 17, it will be added to the standings for day 16.

Results

Play-off match
The team finishing 13th faced the runner-up of 2018 V.League 2.

Nam Dinh FC won the match and would remain in the 2019 V.League 1.

Attendances

By club

By round

Highest attendances

Season statistics

Top scorers

Top assists

Own goals

Hat-tricks

 Note:
4: scored 4 goals; (H) – Home ; (A) – Away

Clean sheets

Awards

Monthly awards

Annual awards

Team of the Year

References

2018
2018 in Asian association football leagues
2018 in Vietnamese football